Maku (Macu, Máku, Mácu, Makú, Macú) or Maco (Mako, Máko, Macó, Makó) is a pejorative term referring to several hunter-gatherer peoples of the upper Amazon, derived from an Arawakan term ma-aku "do not speak / without speech". Nimuendajú (1950), for example, notes six peoples of Colombia, Venezuela, and Brazil that are known as 'Maku'. In linguistic literature, the term refers primarily to:

 the Nadahup languages, a small language family in Brazil, Colombia, and Venezuela, sometimes disambiguated from other Maku languages as Makú or Macú, though those forms can apply to any of the languages, or as Makuan. Such languages include Hup, spoken by Hupda, (Hupdá Makú, Makú-Hupdá, Macú De) and Guariba Maku
 the closely related Nukak Makú and Kakwa (Macu de Cubeo, Macu de Desano, Macu de Guanano, Macú-Paraná)
 the Maku-Auari language, the 'Maku' of Roraima and the Auari River, a possible language isolate of Brazil and Venezuela (also known as Mácu, Máko or Maku of Auari; endonym Jukude)
 the Wirö dialect of Piaroa (sometimes disambiguated as Mako or Maco)  Maco-Hoti

It has also been used for various other languages and peoples in the area, such as:
the Cofán language a.k.a. Mako, Cofán-Makú, or Maco-Cuyabeno. Maco-Cuyabeno was an unattested language that may have been a dialect of the Cofán language (Pérez 1862:475), and was spoken on the Cuyabeno River near the headwaters of the Aguarico River in southeastern Colombia.
the Piaroa language a.k.a. Maco-Ventuari. Maco-Ventuari was an extinct language variety spoken on the Ventuari River in Venezuela that was closely related to the Piaroa language spoken today. It was documented in a 38-word list by Humboldt (1822:155-157).
the Puinave language along the Negro and Japurá Rivers a.k.a. Mácu, Macú, Makú
the Achagua language a.k.a. Makú-Achagua
the Arutani–Sape languages
the Yanomaman languages a.k.a. Macú-Yanomami
the Carabayo language a.k.a. Macú-Carabayo
the Marueta people of Venezuela

See also
 Puinave–Maku languages, a proposed family of Nadahup and various other Maku languages 
 Dorobo, a pejorative term for hunter-gatherers living among the Masai
 San people, a pejorative term for hunter-gatherers living among the Khoekhoe

References

Francois Correa, Introducción a la Colombia Amerindia

Pejorative terms for hunter-gatherers